George Vernon (1661–1735) was an English politician for a Surrey constituency in the late seventeenth and early eighteenth centuries.

Vernon was born in Farnham. His father had been the M.P. for Haslemere from 1685 to 1689. He too served on three separate occasions as the town's MP.

Notes

 
 

 

People from Farnham
1661 births
1735 deaths
17th-century English people
18th-century English people
English MPs 1698–1700
English MPs 1702–1705
British MPs 1713–1715